The Left Alliance is the name of a number of left wing political parties around the world.

These include:

 Democratic Left Alliance in Poland
 Left Alliance (Finland)
 Left Alliance (Scotland) in Fife, Scotland
 Left Alliance (Spain)
 Left Alliance - UK, a grouping including the Union of Liberal Students and the Communist Party of Great Britain
 Nordic Green Left Alliance, an alliance of Nordic left-wing parties
 Left Alliance (Australia), an Australian student movement that flourished in the 1980s and 1990s
 Leftist Alliance (Hungary), an alliance between Yes Solidarity for Hungary Movement and the Hungarian Workers' Party
 Leftist Alliance